Faujdarhat Cadet College is a historic public military high school (grade 7 to grade 12), modelled after public schools in the UK (according to the Public Schools Act 1868), run following the national curriculum of Bangladesh in English version, financed partially by the Bangladesh Army, located at Faujdarhat, near Chattogram, in Bangladesh.

History
Faujdarhat Cadet College boards up to 300 boys for grades 7 to 12. Every year, 50 students are admitted to the college at grade 7 through a nationwide admission test composed of written (Bangla, English, Mathematics, General Knowledge), Viva and Medical Examinations.

It was the first cadet college to be established by Field Marshall Muhammad Ayub Khan in erstwhile East Pakistan facing the Bay of Bengal. It was established on 28 April 1958. Until 1965, it was known as the East Pakistan Cadet College. The school has an area of 185 acres making it the largest high school in Bangladesh. The school was designed by the most prominent artist of Bangladesh, Joynul Abedin.

The principal of the school is usually ranked Colonel or Lieutenant Colonel, and is appointed by the Adjutant General's branch of the Bangladesh Army.

From 2003, the cadet colleges in Bangladesh were converted to the English version of the National Curriculum.

Academic system
Cadets are enrolled in class 7 of the Bangladesh National Curriculum and continue their study for six years up to the end of higher secondary or college level (high school in international standard). They follow the English version syllabus of the National Curriculum and Textbook Board. Three national exams are taken by cadets, once in class 8, named Junior School Certificate (JSC), another in class 10, named Secondary School Certificate (SSC) and the high school leaving examination in class 12 known as the Higher Secondary Certificate (HSC).

Each class generally has fifty students, divided into two sections which are known as forms. The Junior School Certificate (JSC), Secondary School Certificate (SSC) and the Higher Secondary Certificate (HSC) examinations are administered under the direct control of the Board of Education of Chattogram Division. Cadets have shown a clear trend of securing top positions in the merit lists of board examinations every year.

Reunion programs 
Being one of the older educational institutions in the country, and with a long list of illustrious alumni, the college maintains a regular cycle of Reunions every 4 years. Usually, the Old Faujians Association (alumni association of the college) organizes this event teamed up with the college authority.

Reunion 2014 
The Reunion in 2014 was a notable event as the Armed Forces also had lent hand in organizing this extravagant 3-day event. The Alumni endowed the college with their support in building new infrastructure and residential facilities as well as carrying out the large event which was held from 25 December to 27 December.

Diamond Jubilee Reunion (Reunion 2018)  

On 18 January 2018, the Old Faujians Association (alumni association of the college) organized an event called Diamond Jubilee Reunion. Chief of Army Staff, General Abu Belal Muhammad Shafiul Haque inaugurated the event. The program lasted for three days. It started on 18 January and ended on 20 January. On the second day of the program, the legendary singer of this subcontinent, Runa Laila performed on the occasion.

Houses and inter-house competition 
There are four buildings to host the cadets, each two-storied. Each of the houses is given a name, a symbol, and a color.

 Rabindra House: 
House Color: Yellow
House Symbol: Lion
House Motto: Strike and Strive
Former Babar House (South House)
Shahidullah House: 
House Color: Red
House Symbol: Tiger
House Motto: We Shall Never Surrender
Former Akbar House (North House)
 Fazlul Huq House:  
 House Color: Green
 House Symbol: Panther
 House Motto: Never Give In
 Former Ayub House
Nazrul House: 
House Color: Blue
House Symbol: Jaguar
House Motto: They Live Who Dare
Former Shahjahan House

Usually, each house has 75 students, 12 to 13 from each grade. Students are divided into houses during their initial intake year. Year-round extra and co-curricular competitions and activities are arranged in the broad categories of cultural, sports and gardening competitions, as well as in academics. Based on results from each competition, the houses earn 'points' and the highest scoring house in a year is announced a winner at the end of the year. This enhances the competition and holistic development of all the cadets.

Dining hall
The college dining hall is named after its former principal Lt. Col. William Maurice Brown. The dining hall is modeled after the interior of a ship.

Library
The college library is named 'Birsrestho Abdur Rouf Library.' There are around 20,000 (twenty thousand) books in the library with collections from all around the world. The collection of this college library offers books on language, linguistics, mathematics, religion, literature, arts, physics, chemistry, biology, geography, history, computer science, philosophy,  psychology, agriculture, statistics and political science. The Library is enriched with valuable reference materials available such as atlases, dictionaries, encyclopedias, annual reports and publications, survey reports, census reports, country reports, statistical yearbooks, military publications, and audio-visual materials.

Hospital
Faujdarhat Cadet College has a well-developed hospital. It is named after Birsrestho Nur Mohammad, who was killed in the Liberation War of Bangladesh. The hospital is run by a specialized doctor ranked Major or Captain from the medical corps of the Bangladesh Army. Besides cadets, it provides treatment to employees of all classes along with their families. All kinds of basic and first aid treatments are available. It is well-equipped with pathological tools to diagnose basic diseases. In case of critical diseases and emergency situations, patients are sent to Combined Military Hospital, Chittagong.

Alumni

Government and politics

Military and diplomacy

Academia and science

Culture, entertainment and sports

Banking and corporate

Books Published by Alumni
1. Demography and the Global Business Environment (Alfred Marcus & Mazhar Islam)

References

Further reading 
 Shakoor Majid, Class Seven 1978, Onnyaprakash, Dhaka, February 2008. .(review)
 Mohammad Ataul Karim, A Steeplechase Story, Katskill, December 2008.

External links 

 Old Faujians Association
 Faujdarhat Cadet College

Military high schools
1958 establishments in East Pakistan
Education in Bangladesh
Educational Institutions affiliated with Bangladesh Army
Faujdarhat Cadet College
Educational institutions established in 1958